Lower Dir District is a district of Khyber Pakhtunkhwa province in Pakistan. Timergara city is the district headquarter and largest city. The district was formed in 1996, when Dir District was divided into Upper Dir and Lower Dir. The district borders Swat District on its East, Afghanistan on its West, Upper Dir and Chitral on its North and North-West respectively and Malakand and Bajaur Agency on its South.The people of lower dir is yousafzai pathan. And other are Ali khan khail

History 
At the time of independence of Pakistan,  Dir was a princely state ruled by Nawab Shah Jehan Khan. It was merged with Pakistan in 1969 and later declared a district in 1970.nowsday Dir lower have most user of social media in province KPK.

Demographics 
At the time of the 2017 census the district had a population of 1,436,082, of which 709,829 were males and 726,203 females. Rural population was 1,395,768 (97.19%) while the urban population was 40,314 (2.81%). The literacy rate was 61.83% - the male literacy rate was 74.45% while the female literacy rate was 49.45%. 471 people in the district were from religious minorities. Pashto was the predominant language, spoken by 99.30% of the population.

Education
 University of Malakand is a public university located in Chakdara.
 University of Dir

Administration

National Assembly 
NA-6 (Lower Dir-I) and NA-7 (Lower Dir-II) are constituencies of the National Assembly of Pakistan from Lower Dir district. These areas were formerly part of NA-34 (Lower Dir) constituency from 1977 to 2018. The delimitation in 2018 split Lower Dir into two separate constituencies, NA-6 (Lower Dir-I) and NA-7 (Lower Dir-II).'''

NA-34 constituency (2002-2018)

Since 2018: NA-6 (Lower Dir-I) and NA-7 (Lower Dir-II)

Provincial Assembly

Notable people
 Nawabzada Shahabuddin Khan, Former Ruler of Lower Dir
 Siraj ul Haq, politician
 Muhammad Bashir Khan, politician
 Naseem Shah, cricketer
 Zahid Khan, Ex-Senator
 Imran Khan Snr(cricketer, born 1987) 
 Abaseen Yousfzai (Pashto poet)

See also

 Constituency NA-6 (Lower Dir-I)
 Constituency NA-7 (Lower Dir-II)
 Education in Lower Dir District
 Upper Dir District

References 

https://senate.gov.pk/en/profile.php?uid=804

External links
Khyber-Pakhtunkhwa Government website section on Lower Dir
Khyber-Pakhtunkhwa news website section on Lower Dir

 
Districts of Khyber Pakhtunkhwa